Auahitūroa is a male Māori deity, personification of comets, and the origin of fire.

His consort is Mahuika, the goddess of fire.

See also
Māori mythology

References
 E. Best, Māori Religion and Mythology, Part 2. Dominion Museum Bulletin No.11. (Museum of New Zealand: Wellington), 1982.

Fire gods
Māori gods